Jackson Mabokgwane (born 19 January 1988) is a South African soccer player who plays as a goalkeeper for Baroka in the Premier Soccer League and the South African national soccer team.

References

External links

1988 births
Living people
People from Polokwane
South African soccer players
South Africa international soccer players
Association football goalkeepers
South African Premier Division players
Mamelodi Sundowns F.C. players
Mpumalanga Black Aces F.C. players
Cape Town City F.C. (2016) players
Platinum Stars F.C. players
Bidvest Wits F.C. players
Orlando Pirates F.C. players
Bloemfontein Celtic F.C. players
Royal AM F.C. players
Baroka F.C. players
2015 Africa Cup of Nations players
Soccer players from Limpopo